A state of necessity may refer to:
 Canon 1324
 Doctrine of necessity
 Military necessity
 Necessity (criminal law)
 Necessity (tort)
 State of exception